Cape Baranov (Mys Baranova) is a headland in Severnaya Zemlya, Russia.

History
The Laptev Sea shore of present-day Severnaya Zemlya was discovered by Boris Vilkitsky in 1913 during the Arctic Ocean Hydrographic Expedition on behalf of the Russian Hydrographic Service, but he was unaware that there was a strait west of the cape between what is now Bolshevik Island and the islands further north, for the straits are frozen most of the year, forming a compact whole.

This cape was named during the 1930–1932 expedition to the archipelago led by Georgy Ushakov and Nikolay Urvantsev after Soviet scientist Fedor Baranov (1886–1965).

This is currently the only Arctic research facility operating in Severnaya Zemlya.

Geography
Cape Baranov is located in the northern part of Bolshevik Island facing the Shokalsky Strait. This headland stretches out northwards in an unglaciated lowland area west of the mouth of Mikoyan Bay.

See also
List of research stations in the Arctic

References

External links
Russian scientists have found a sharp decrease in the concentration of ozone over the Cape Baranov Research Base (in Russian)
YouTube - Мыс Баранова. Обзор
Evacuation of "North Pole - 40" station

Baranov
Baranov
Baranov